Karin Baumeister-Rehm (born 1971 in Bavaria, West Germany) is a German born artist.  Her career spans many years, starting as an abstract painter, and developing into a major creative force.  Today she is well known for painted flowers and panel canvases.  She prefers bright colors, enjoys painting texture, and blending acrylics.

Biography
Having lived in Tokyo for a number of years before coming to the United States, Baumeister-Rehm's works can be correlated to Ikebana style art. 

Karin paints in her studio in Apex, North Carolina, and does metal work and welding in a studio in Siler City, North Carolina.  She has started a series with heritage and historical windows/metal work creations.  Visit her shows, and be prepared to be surprised what she does. Karin lives in Apex, North Carolina with her husband Norbert, and two children, Tim and Jannik.

Karin is the originator of the Nesting for Peace global art project. She has also always collected many different kinds and textures of papers.  She is most happy with her work when color surrounds an object on the canvas.

She moved back to Barvaria, Germany in spring 2009.

See also
 List of German painters

References

1971 births
Living people
20th-century German painters
21st-century German painters
German women painters
20th-century German women
21st-century German women